The Cabot Trail is a scenic highway on Cape Breton Island in Nova Scotia, Canada. It is a  loop around the northern tip of the island, passing along and through the Cape Breton Highlands and the Cape Breton Highlands National Park.

It is named after the explorer John Cabot who landed in Atlantic Canada in 1497, although modern historians agree his landfall likely took place in Newfoundland and not Cape Breton Island. Premier Angus L. MacDonald wanted to re-brand Nova Scotia for tourism purposes as primarily Scottish and, as part of this effort, created both the names Cape Breton Highlands and Cabot Trail. Construction of the initial route was completed in 1932.

The western and eastern sections follow the rugged coastline, with views of the ocean. The southwestern section passes through the Margaree River valley before passing along Bras d'Or Lake. The route is within the county municipalities of Victoria and Inverness.

The Cabot Trail includes all of Trunk 30, as well as the portion of Nova Scotia Highway 105 between exits 7 and 11. Following are some stops along the route, travelling clockwise from the south:
 Baddeck, the location of the Alexander Graham Bell National Historic Site.
 Chéticamp, an Acadian fishing village.
 Pleasant Bay, site of a bay with whale watching possibilities.
 Cape North, a headland at the northernmost point of the Cabot Trail.
 Dingwall, a small fishing village.
 Ingonish, site of the Keltic Lodge resort and Cape Smokey Provincial Park.
 St. Anns, home of the Gaelic College of Celtic Arts and Crafts.

See also
 List of Nova Scotia provincial highways

Gallery

References

External links

 Cabot Trail official website
 Hike the Highlands Festival
 Cape Breton Highlands National Park

Nova Scotia provincial highways
Roads in Inverness County, Nova Scotia
Roads in Victoria County, Nova Scotia
Scenic travelways in Nova Scotia
Tourist attractions in Inverness County, Nova Scotia
Tourist attractions in Victoria County, Nova Scotia

